Mateus Gonçalo Espanha Fernandes (born 10 July 2004) is a Portuguese professional footballer who plays as a midfielder for Sporting CP.

Professional career
Fernandes is a youth product of his local club Olhanense, and moved to Sporting CP's youth academy in 2016. He was promoted to their B-team for the 2021-22 season. On 14 October 2022, he signed a professional contract with the club tying him until 2027 with a release clause of €60 million. He made his professional and senior debut with Sporting as a late substitute in a 3–1 Primeira Liga win over Casa Pia on 22 October 2022.

International career
Fernandes is a youth international for Portugal, having played up to the Portugal U19s.

References

External links
 
 
 Sporting Profile

2004 births
Living people
People from Olhão
Portuguese footballers
Portugal youth international footballers
Association football midfielders
Sporting CP footballers
Sporting CP B players
Primeira Liga players